William Bigelow Easton was an American mathematician who proved Easton's theorem about the possible values of the continuum function. His advisor at Princeton was the famed mathematician and computer scientist Alonzo Church.

Publications

References

American mathematicians
Set theorists
Computer scientists
Year of birth missing
Possibly living people